DTA may refer to:

DTA Records, an American record label founded by Travis Barker
Death to America
Deferred tax assets, an accounting concept
Democratic Turnhalle Alliance, a political party in Namibia
Dental Technologists Association
Detainee Treatment Act of 2005
Development trust association
Differential thermal analysis
Digital television adapter, a digital-to-analog converter
Digital Transgender Archive
Digital transport adapter
Divisão de Transportes Aéreos, the former name of TAAG Angola Airlines
Docosatetraenoic acid
Domestic Tariff Area
 Double Tax Agreement, another name for a Tax treaty
DownThemAll!, a download manager/accelerator extension for Mozilla Firefox
Downtown Annapolis, Maryland
Duluth Transit Authority
.dta, a file format used by:
 Stata, a statistics application
 sequest, a tandem mass spectrometry data analysis program used for protein identification
D-threonine aldolase, an enzyme
DTA sarl, a French ultralight aircraft manufacturer

External links
 acronyms.thefreedictionary.com/DTA, other definitions of DTA